Forfey Festival was an annual music festival held on Forfey Farm near Lisnaskea, County Fermanagh, Northern Ireland. The festival was last held in 2014. Each year's memorabilia (posters, flyers, social media and merchandise) featured a different animal as its theme, predominantly drawn by Neil Gillespie. 2014 was subtitled "Anno Rex", in memory of the farm's sole permanent resident, Rex.

History
Forfey Festival was founded in 2006 by Matt Minford, bassist and vocalist of SixStarHotel. His family (still) own Forfey Farm, and for a number of years it had lain largely unused. For the first two years of the festival's existence, Minford was unable to obtain an entertainments licence for the farm, and so musical performances were held at other locations in Fermanagh, while the farm hosted arts exhibitions and camping. From 2008, the whole festival was held on Forfey Farm.

Location
Forfey was held on a small family farm. While the festival was in progress, one field hosted camping and one field, car parking. Music venues included three sheds (known as the Hayshed, Lie-To, and The Pit) and a cottage attic (known as "The 1951"). Various outbuildings hosted mixed-media visual art exhibitions and film screenings.

Lineups

References

External links
Official Website
Video documentary (Babysweet Sessions 2009)

Music festivals in Northern Ireland
Recurring events established in 2006
County Fermanagh
2006 establishments in Northern Ireland
Summer events in Northern Ireland